Legumain is a protein that in humans is encoded by the LGMN gene.

This gene encodes a cysteine protease, legumain, that has a strict specificity for hydrolysis of asparaginyl bonds. This enzyme may be involved in the processing of bacterial peptides and endogenous proteins for MHC class II presentation in the lysosomal/endosomal systems. Enzyme activation is triggered by acidic pH and appears to be autocatalytic. Protein expression occurs after monocytes differentiate into dendritic cells. A fully mature, active enzyme is produced following lipopolysaccharide expression in mature dendritic cells. Overexpression of this gene may be associated with the majority of solid tumor types. This gene has a pseudogene on chromosome 13. Several alternatively spliced transcript variants have been described, but the biological validity of only two has been determined. These two variants encode the same isoform.

References

Further reading